Dytomyia is a genus of flies in the family Dolichopodidae. It is known from Australia, Madagascar and Kenya, with an undescribed species from Papua New Guinea.

Species
The genus contains the following species:
 Dytomyia bancrofti Bickel, 1994 – Australia
 Dytomyia deconinckae Grichanov, 1998 – Madagascar
 Dytomyia flavicaudata Grichanov, 2021 – Kenya
 Dytomyia elenae Grichanov, 1998 – Madagascar
 Dytomyia flaviseta Bickel, 1994 – Australia
 Dytomyia lutescens (Vanschuytbroeck, 1952) – Madagascar
 Dytomyia paulyi Grichanov, 1998 – Madagascar
 Dytomyia sordida (Parent, 1928) – Australia
 Dytomyia torresiana Bickel, 1994 – Australia
 Dytomyia tumifrons Bickel, 1994 – Australia

The species Sciapus nubilis Parent, 1935, which was described from a single female from Madagascar, was transferred to this genus in 2003, but was later considered a nomen dubium in 2021.

References 

Dolichopodidae genera
Sciapodinae
Diptera of Australasia
Diptera of Africa